Pazundaung (lit. 'prawn hill') is a Burmese name that may refer to:

 Pazundaung Creek:  A creek in eastern Yangon, Myanmar
 Pazundaung Market:  A market in southeastern part of Yangon
 Pazundaung Township:  A township in southeastern Yangon